State Highway 28 (SH 28) is a New Zealand state highway in the Waikato region. Prior to the formation of SH 28 the quickest route, only if using state highways, was via Tīrau and SH 27. There are no towns on this route and due to the highway being mapped to existing rural roads there are several places were motorists need to give way to traffic from other roads.

Route
SH 28 leaves SH 1 at Putāruru on Whites Road and after travelling north-east for 5.8 km the highway meets  and shares a concurrency eastbound for 2.5 km. SH 28 then leaves SH 5 and travels northbound on Harwoods Road /Te Poi Road (South) for the next 10.7 km where it turns east at a T-junction onto Rapurapu Road. The last 5 km leads to its terminus at SH 29 just at the foot of the Kaimai Ranges.

See also
 List of New Zealand state highways

References

External links
New Zealand Transport Agency

28
Transport in Waikato